Sarpar or Sar Par may refer to:
 Sarpar, Khuzestan
 Sar Par, Kohgiluyeh and Boyer-Ahmad